Eileen O'Hearn (November 8, 1913 – September 22, 1992) was an American actress. She is best known for appeaing in The Richest Man in Town (1941), The Devil's Trail (1942) and Parachute Nurse (1942). 

Born in Kansas City, O'Hearn was the daughter of Mr. and Mrs. M. J. O'Hearn. When she lived in Kansas City, she studied voice and sang the title role in the opera Mignon. She attended UCLA, where she appeared in a production of Of Thee I Sing. Her other early acting experience included acting at the Westwood Community Theater and Pasadena Community Playhouse. She also appeared on television in Kansas City, Missouri. She was a stenographer for the Los Angeles Times when Columbia Pictures signed her after she took a screen test.

O'Hearn married Frederick Pate, an employee at Columbia studios, on March 7, 1942, in Yuma, Arizona. She moved to Kodiak Island, Alaska, where she entertained in a retirement home by singing and playing the piano. She died there in September 1992 at the age of 78.

Filmography

Film

References

External links 

Rotten Tomatoes profile

1913 births
1992 deaths
People from Missouri
Actresses from Missouri
American film actresses
20th-century American actresses